Del Riley may refer to:
 Delbert Riley, a Canadian First Nations leader and former Chief of the National Indian Brotherhood
 Del Riley (clerk), the county clerk who pioneered Oregon's vote-by-mail system